The 1948 Central Michigan Chippewas football team represented Central Michigan College of Education, later renamed Central Michigan University, as an independent during the 1948 college football season.  In their second season under head coach Lyle Bennett, the Chippewas compiled a 3–6 record and were outscored by their opponents by a combined total of 139 to 127.

Art Teixera ranked first in the country with an average of 44.5 yards on 42 punts. Isham Williams passed for 576 yards.

Schedule

References

Central Michigan
Central Michigan Chippewas football seasons
Central Michigan Chippewas football